The 2018 United States Senate special election in Minnesota took place on November 6, 2018, to elect a United States senator from Minnesota to replace incumbent Democratic Senator Al Franken until the regular expiration of the term on January 3, 2021. Facing multiple accusations of sexual misconduct, Franken announced on December 7, 2017, that he would resign effective January 2, 2018. Governor Mark Dayton appointed Franken's successor, Tina Smith, on December 13, 2017, and she ran in the special election. This election coincided with a regularly scheduled U.S. Senate election for the Class 1 Senate seat, U.S. House elections, a gubernatorial election, State House elections, and other elections.

The candidate filing deadline was June 5, 2018, and the primary election was held on August 14, 2018. Smith won the Democratic primary and defeated Republican nominee Karin Housley in the general election.

DFL primary

Candidates

Nominated
 Tina Smith, incumbent U.S. Senator

Eliminated in primary
 Ali Chehem
 Gregg A. Iverson, perennial candidate
 Nick Leonard, attorney and activist
 Richard Painter, University of Minnesota Law School professor and former White House ethics lawyer under President George W. Bush
 Christopher Lovell Seymore Sr.

Declined
 Keith Ellison, U.S. Representative (running for Minnesota Attorney General)
 Betty McCollum, U.S. Representative (running for reelection)
 Rick Nolan, U.S. Representative (running for Lieutenant Governor of Minnesota)
 Collin Peterson, U.S. Representative (running for reelection)
 Patricia Torres Ray, state senator (running for MN-5)
 Tim Walz, U.S. Representative (running for Governor)
 Lori Swanson, Attorney General of Minnesota (running for governor)
 Jake Sullivan, former National Security Adviser to Vice President Joe Biden
 Scott Dibble, state senator
 Melisa Franzen, state senator

Endorsements

Results

Republican primary

Candidates

Nominated
 Karin Housley, state senator

Eliminated in primary
 Bob Anderson, businessman
 Nikolay Nikolayevich Bey

Declined
 Michele Bachmann, former U.S. Representative
 Christopher Chamberlin (running for MN-05)
 Norm Coleman, former U.S. Senator (endorsed Karin Housley)
 Tom Emmer, U.S. Representative (endorsed Karin Housley)
 Jenifer Loon, state representative (endorsed Karin Housley)
 Tim Pawlenty, former governor of Minnesota (ran for governor, lost)
 Julie Rosen, Minnesota state senator
 Sarah Anderson, Minnesota state representative
 Michelle Benson, state senator
 Kurt Daudt, Speaker of the Minnesota House of Representatives
 Paul Gazelka, Majority Leader of the Minnesota Senate
 Amy Koch, former Minnesota state senator
 Pete Hegseth, veteran, Fox News Contributor and candidate for the U.S. Senate in 2012
 Jason Lewis, U.S. Representative
 Mike Lindell, CEO of My Pillow
 Stewart Mills III, businessman and nominee for MN-08 in 2014 and 2016
 Erik Paulsen, U.S. Representative
 Joyce Peppin, Majority Leader of the Minnesota House of Representatives

Endorsements

Results

Minor parties and independents

Candidates
Jerry Trooien (independent), real estate developer
Sarah Wellington (Legal Marijuana Now Party)

General election

Predictions 

^Highest rating given

Endorsements

Fundraising

Polling

Results 
Smith won the election by 10.62 percentage points. Her margin was similar to that of Democratic gubernatorial nominee Tim Walz, who defeated his Republican opponent by 11.41%. Both of those margins of victory were much smaller than that of senior Senator Amy Klobuchar, who on the same day defeated her Republican opponent by 24.1 points. Smith won by huge margins in the Democratic strongholds of Hennepin County and Ramsey County, home of Minneapolis and St. Paul respectively. She also managed a 10% margin of victory in suburban Dakota County, just outside Minneapolis, and won St. Louis County, home of Duluth. Housley won most of the state's rural areas. Turnout was high for a midterm election, with over 63% of registered voters in Minnesota casting ballots.

By congressional district
Smith won 4 of 8 congressional districts.

Voter demographics

See also
 2018 Minnesota elections

References

External links
Elections & Voting – Minnesota Secretary of State
Candidates at Vote Smart
Candidates at Ballotpedia
Campaign finance at FEC
Campaign finance at OpenSecrets

Official campaign websites
Karin Housley (R) for Senate
Tina Smith (D) for Senate
Jerry Trooien (I) for Senate

Minnesota 2018
2018 special
Minnesota special
Minnesota 2018
United States Senate special
United States Senate 2018